was a 6,377-ton Japanese merchant vessel, used as a transport ship and hospital ship during World War II. She was torpedoed and sunk with the loss of some 3,700 lives on 27 September 1944.

History
Ural Maru was a combined cargo/passenger vessel owned and operated by Osaka Shosen (the predecessor to Mitsui OSK Lines). She was completed in 1929 by the Mitsubishi Nagasaki Shipyards and was in regularly scheduled service between Kobe and Osaka in Japan and the port of Dairen in the Kwantung Leased Territory on the Asian mainland. Ural Maru made her first voyage on 12 April 1929.

Her civilian career was relatively uneventful, although she was damaged in Osaka by a typhoon in 1934 

In 1937, after the start of the Second Sino-Japanese War, Ural Maru was requisitioned by the Imperial Japanese Army and converted into a hospital ship from 13 October 1937 to February 1938, returning sick and wounded soldiers from the front back to Japan.

Ural Maru was briefly returned to commercial service, but was requisitioned again by the Imperial Japanese Army in November 1941, and used primarily as a military transport to carry troops and military supplies from the Army’s primary staging area of Hiroshima in Japan to various ports in southeast Asia, including Saigon, Singapore, the Philippines, Rabaul, Rangoon and Palau in the initial stages of the war. In February 1943, she was converted to a hospital ship again, and was painted white with a large red cross, as per international regulations.

On 3 April 1943, when evacuating 50 wounded soldiers from Guadalcanal, Ural Maru was bombed by USAAF Boeing B-17 Flying Fortress bombers and lightly damaged. She managed to return to Osaka, where the damage was much publicized. [A differing record of the bomber type may be found in the Unit Diary (held in the Australian War Memorial Canberra) of 2/1 Australian Hospital Ship "Manunda". In the diary there is a "Special Report" received 5 April 1943 which stated that a USAAF B-24 (Liberator) bomber from 321st Squadron, 90th Bomber Group, had on 3 April bombed and damaged Hospital Ship "Ural Maru" off New Hanover Island in the Bismark Group (300 km N-W of Rabaul)]. Contemporary Japanese press labeled the attack on a clearly marked hospital ship carrying civilians as a war crime. In response to the Australian protest against the sinking of the hospital ship Centaur, the Japanese had lodged a counter-protest about attacks on, and the sinking of a number of their own hospital ships, including the Ural Maru.

On her last voyage, Ural Maru had departed Singapore bound for Takao in Taiwan and had called on Kuching and Miri in Japanese-occupied Sarawak, where she loaded Japanese wounded, nurses and a number of "comfort women". In addition there were ten unusual passengers – Indian National Army cadets of Indian origin on their way to Japan for military training. Only one of them, Bishan Singh, died in the sinking. One of the survivors, Ramesh S. Benegal, went on to become an officer in the Indian Air Force in independent India and retired as an Air Commodore. He provided a first-person account of the sinking of the Ural Maru in his book "Burma to Japan with Azad Hind - A War Memoir". The complement of passengers is also based on his account.

References

External links
Maritime Disasters of World War II. "Burma to Japan with Azad Hind - A War Memoir" (Lancer Publishers, New Delhi, copyright Meera R. Benegal, 2009).
Tabular Record of Movement (Japanese)

Notes

See also

List by death toll of ships sunk by submarines
List of battles and other violent events by death toll
Hikari Kikan

1928 ships
Ships built by Mitsubishi Heavy Industries
Merchant ships of Japan
Passenger ships of Japan
World War II merchant ships of Japan
Hospital ships in World War II
Ships of the Imperial Japanese Army
Ships sunk by American submarines
Maritime incidents in September 1944
World War II shipwrecks in the South China Sea